Gustav Hollaender (15 February 1855 in Leobschütz  –  4 December 1915 in Berlin) was a German violinist, conductor, composer and teacher. 
He was the son of a doctor in Leobschütz (Upper Silesia) also eldest brother of the famous writer Felix Hollaender and the well-known operetta composer Viktor Hollaender. His musical talents were discovered at an early age. He attended the Leipzig Conservatory of Music at the age of twelve, where he counted Ferdinand David in particular among his teachers. Later, the bright student came to Berlin to the Royal Music Academy and completed his artistic training there under the masters Joseph Joachim (violin) and Friedrich Kiel (composition). First, Hollaender stayed in Berlin, became a member of the Royal Orchestra, as well as a violin teacher at the Berliner Musikschule (also known Theodor Kullak Institute, later Stern Conservatory). He earned himself the reputation of an excellent violinist as a participant in the trio association with Dr. Hans Bischoft and Hermann Jacobowsky, later with Xaver Scharwenka and Heinrich Grünfeld not only in Berlin through the chamber music evenings in the Singakademie, but throughout Germany through frequent concert tours. After a major concert tour, which he undertook with Carlotta Patti, Theodore Ritter and Felix Mottl through Austria, the artist was sent to Cologne in 1881 as a member of the Gürzenich Orchestra and at the same time as a violin teacher at the local conservatory. He was given a title of royal professor of music in 1893.He took over Stern Conservatory of Berlin in 1895 as an owner and director. After his death, the conservatory awarded a Gustav Hollaender medal to outstanding students, including Claudio Arrau, Johanna Bizony, Baruch Liftman, and Else Schmitz-Gohr. He composed many violin works including violin concerti. He was uncle of the more famous film composer Friedrich Hollaender.(See Great Jews in Music by Darryl Lyman). His students included violinist and composer Else Streit.

References

1) Gustav Holländer Collection, Leo Back Institute, www.archive.org

External links

1855 births
1915 deaths
19th-century German musicians
19th-century German male musicians
German violinists
German male violinists
People from Głubczyce
People from the Province of Silesia